Oran socialiste was a weekly newspaper published from Oran, Algeria, 1928–1939. Oran socialiste was the organ of the French Section of the Workers International (S.F.I.O.) in Oran. Oran socialiste was founded and edited by Marius Dubois.

References

Defunct newspapers published in Algeria
Defunct weekly newspapers
French-language newspapers published in Algeria
French Section of the Workers' International
Mass media in Oran
Publications established in 1928
Publications disestablished in 1939
Socialism in Algeria
Socialist newspapers